Leonardo Matías Heredia (born 11 January 1996) is an Argentine professional footballer who plays as a midfielder for Estudiantes, on loan from Atlético Tucumán.

Career
Heredia's first club were Almirante Brown. He made his professional debut in Primera B Nacional in June 2014 versus Huracán, after being an unused substitute for four matches during the previous May. The club were relegated in 2013–14 to Primera B Metropolitana. Twenty appearances later, Heredia scored his first career goal in a 3–1 win over Tristán Suárez on 17 May 2016. In August 2017, Heredia's rights were sold to a business group who later assigned the midfielder to Uruguayan club Boston River. He was immediately loaned to Colón back in his homeland, where he'd remain for two full seasons.

Heredia joined Atlético Tucumán on loan ahead of the 2019–20 season. He made his debut on 4 September in a Copa Argentina win over Boca Unidos, with his first goal arriving in November against San Lorenzo. He subsequently scored two goals in the Copa Libertadores in the succeeding February, netting in victories versus The Strongest and Independiente Medellín respectively. In September 2020, Heredia was signed permanently by Atlético Tucumán; he penned a four-year contract. On 27 June 2022 it was confirmed, that Heredia had joined fellow league club Estudiantes de La Plata on loan for the rest of the year with a purchase option.

Career statistics
.

References

External links

1996 births
Living people
People from La Matanza Partido
Argentine footballers
Association football midfielders
Argentine expatriate footballers
Sportspeople from Buenos Aires Province
Primera Nacional players
Primera B Metropolitana players
Uruguayan Primera División players
Uruguayan Segunda División players
Argentine Primera División players
Club Almirante Brown footballers
Boston River players
Club Atlético Colón footballers
Atlético Tucumán footballers
Estudiantes de La Plata footballers
Argentine expatriate sportspeople in Uruguay
Expatriate footballers in Uruguay